Ilyinskoye is a rural locality (a village) in Sidorovskoye Rural Settlement, Gryazovetsky District, Vologda Oblast, Russia. The population was 11 as of 2002.

Geography 
Ilyinskoye is located 45 km southeast of Gryazovets (the district's administrative centre) by road. Vanchino is the nearest rural locality.

References 

Rural localities in Gryazovetsky District